Research into great ape language has involved teaching chimpanzees, bonobos, gorillas and orangutans to communicate with humans and with each other using sign language, physical tokens, lexigrams, and mimicking human speech. Some primatologists argue that these primates' use of the communication tools indicates their ability to use "language", although this is not consistent with some definitions of that term.

Apes that demonstrate understanding 
Non-human animals have been recorded to have produced behaviors that are consistent with meanings accorded to human sentence productions. (A production is a stream of lexemes with semantic content. A language is grammar and a set of lexemes. A sentence, or statement, is a stream of lexemes that obeys a grammar, with a beginning and an end.) Some animals in the following species can be said to "understand" (receive), and some can "apply" (produce) consistent, appropriate, grammatical streams of communication. David Premack and Jacques Vauclair have cited language research for the following animals (but see "Criticisms of primate language research", below):
 Chimpanzees
 Bonobos
 Gorillas
 Orangutans

While communication appears to be a consistent feature utilized by all animals in the wild, the tendency toward autonomic behaviors and displays remains the most common among primates. Behaviors like body posture, facial expressions, vocalizations and scent production have been observed to convey information to other animals revealing emotions or alerts about potential danger. Behavior is also used to solidify hierarchical social rankings. In the natural world, affiliative behaviors such as grooming are used to promote group cohesion and relational status among primates. In contrast, displays of aggression can also create divisions among groups.

Use of sign language 
Sign language and computer keyboards are used in primate language research because non-human primate vocal cords cannot close fully, and they have less control of the tongue and lower jaw. However, primates do possess the manual dexterity required for keyboard operation.

Many researchers into animal language have presented the results of the studies described below as evidence of linguistic abilities in animals. Many of their conclusions have been disputed.

It is now generally accepted that apes can learn to sign and are able to communicate with humans. However, it is disputed as to whether they can form syntax to manipulate such signs.

Washoe 

Washoe, a common chimpanzee, was caught in the wild in 1966. When she was about ten months old, she was received by the husband-and-wife research team of Beatrix T. Gardner and Robert Allen Gardner. Chimpanzees are completely dependent until two years of age and semi-dependent until the age of four. Full adult growth is reached between 12 and 16 years of age. Accordingly, the Gardners received her at an appropriate age for research into language development. The Gardners tried to make Washoe's environment as similar as possible to what a human infant with deaf parents would experience. There was always a researcher or assistant in attendance during Washoe's waking hours. Every researcher communicated with Washoe by using American Sign Language (ASL), minimizing the use of the spoken voice. The researchers acted as friends and companions to Washoe, using various games to make the learning as exciting as possible.

The Gardners used many different training methods:
 Imitation: After Washoe had learned a couple of words, she started, like chimpanzees usually do, to imitate naturally. For example, when she entered the Gardners' bathroom, she spontaneously made the sign for "toothbrush", simply because she saw one.
 Babbling: In this case, "babbling" does not mean vocal babbling. Instead, Washoe used untaught signs to express a desire. She used a begging gesture, which was not much different from the ASL signs "give me" and "come". (Human infants who are learning sign language often babble with their hands.)
 Instrumental conditioning: The researchers used instrumental conditioning strategies with Washoe. For example, they taught the word "more" by using tickling as a reward. This technique was later applied to a variety of relevant situations.

The results of the Gardners' efforts were as follows:
 Vocabulary: When a sign was reported by three independent observers, it was added to a checklist. The sign had to occur in an appropriate context and without prompting. The checklist was used to record the frequency of a sign. A sign had to be used at least once a day for 15 consecutive days before it was deemed to have been acquired. Alternatively, a sign had to be used at least 15 days out of 30 consecutive days. By the end of the 22nd month of the project, thirty-four signs had been learned.
 Differentiation: Washoe used the sign "more" in many different situations until a more specific sign had been learned. At one point, she used the sign for "flower" to express the idea of "smell". After additional training, Washoe was eventually able to differentiate between "smell" and "flower".
 Transfer: Although the same object was presented for each learning trial (a specific hat, for example), Washoe was able to use the sign for other similar objects (e.g. other hats).
 Combinations: Washoe was able to combine two or three signs in an original way. For example, "open food drink" meant "open the fridge" and "please open hurry" meant "please open it quickly".

Washoe also taught other chimpanzees, such as Loulis, some ASL signs without any help from humans.

Nim Chimpsky 

Linguistic critics challenged the animal trainers to demonstrate that Washoe was actually using language and not symbols. The null hypothesis was that the Gardners were using conditioning to teach the chimpanzee to use hand formations in certain contexts to create desirable outcomes, and that they had not learned the same linguistic rules that humans innately learn.

In response to this challenge, the chimpanzee Nim Chimpsky (whose name is a play on linguist Noam Chomsky) was taught to communicate using sign language in studies led by Herbert S. Terrace, documented in his 1987 book.

Nim was taken from his mother at a young age by Terrace and put into a household of hippy-like people who had no background with sign language, nor did they use it. Nim was treated as more of a house pet than a wild animal. During his time in the house, Nim's family gave him access to both illegal and legal substances, such as marijuana and alcohol, and did not think twice about letting him use them. Nim's experience did not begin as an observational experience, due to the fact that there were no log books kept at this point in his life.

It was not until Nim was introduced to Laura Pettito that he began his journey with learning sign language. To no surprise, Nim was almost unresponsive to sign language unless there was something in it for him if he did the sign. With many observers and trainers guiding Nim in his learning of sign language, the observations gave clear insight on what the outcome truly was. The trainers noted that Nim had made over 20,000 sequences, only for Terrace to disprove that by noticing that Nim was merely repeating signs done by his trainers. This observation had Terrace believing that, in total, Nim knew about 125 signs.

After years of being a test subject, Nim became aggressive and extremely dangerous to those around him. He would attack the researchers, sending some of them to the hospital. He bit Pettito several times, which in one instance, led to her having to get 37 stitches, and he nearly tore off another woman's cheek. In his later years, Nim was housed at a ranch, supported by the Fund for Animals in Texas, where he had access to the interior of the house, and during one incident, a small household poodle barked at him, and was subsequently smashed to death by the chimpanzee.

Overall, the experiment done on Nim did not produce much useful information. Through all of the tests it is seen that Nim merely copied the signs shown to him. This experiment also showed that non-human primates are able to memorize the outcome of certain things and if they enjoy what they get from it, they are more likely to reciprocate it because their memory shows them that they can get what they want with certain signs. Due to that fact that there was little to no meaningful outcomes from this project, scientists determined that non-human primates mimic, are able to memorize things with different outcomes and they have a higher likelihood of becoming dangerous and aggressive when taken out of their natural habitat at a young age.

Koko 

Dr. Francine "Penny" Patterson, a student of the Gardners, in 1972 began an ongoing program to teach ASL to a lowlands gorilla named Koko.  Unlike the Gardners she did not limit her English speech around Koko, and as a result Koko was reported to understand approximately 1,000 ASL signs and 2,000 English words.  Her results were similar to the Gardners' results with chimpanzees; although the gorilla learned a large number of signs, she never understood grammar or symbolic speech, and did not display any cognition beyond that of a 2–3 year old human child.

Approximately 72 hours of video were taken recording Koko’s interactions and learning behaviors. While Koko’s ability to successfully produce language has been argued among researchers, behaviors that appear to mimic speech, such as breathing heavily into a telephone or other learned physical gestures have been labeled as intentional but ultimately not communicative. From a biological standpoint, non-human primates lack the correct anatomy necessary to produce the same audible speech found in humans; however vocalizations, gestures, and expressions remain a common form used to communicate in the natural world. Koko learned and was taught to compensate for this by creating cues to emulate sounds replicating speech and through her use of visual indicators.

Plastic tokens 
Sarah and two other chimpanzees, Elizabeth and Peony, in the research programs of David Premack, demonstrated the ability to produce grammatical streams of token selections. The selections came from a vocabulary of several dozen plastic tokens; it took each of the chimpanzees hundreds of trials to reliably associate a token with a referent, such as an apple or banana. The tokens were chosen to be completely different in appearance from the referents. After learning these protocols, Sarah was then able to associate other tokens with consistent behaviors, such as negation, name-of, and if-then. The plastic tokens were placed on a magnetic slate, within a rectangular frame in a line. The tokens had to be selected and placed in a consistent order (a grammar) in order for the trainers to reward the chimpanzees.

One other chimpanzee, Gussie, was trained along with Sarah but failed to learn a single word. Other chimpanzees in the projects were not trained in the use of the tokens. All nine of the chimpanzees could understand gestures, such as supplication when asking for food; similarly, all nine could point to indicate some object, a gesture which is not seen in the wild. The supplication is seen in the wild, as a form of communication with other chimpanzees.

A juvenile Sumatran orangutan Aazk (named after the American Association of Zookeepers) who lived at the Roeding Park Zoo (Fresno, California) was taught by Gary L. Shapiro from 1973 to 1975 how to "read & write" with plastic children's letters, following the training techniques of David Premack. The technique of conditional discrimination was used such that the orangutan could eventually distinguish plastic letter (symbols) as representations of referents (e.g., object, actions) and "read" an increasingly longer series of symbols to obtain a referent (e.g., fruit) or "write" an increasingly longer series of symbols to request or describe a referent. While no claim of linguistic competence was made, Aazk's performance demonstrated design features of language, many similar to those demonstrated by Premack's chimpanzee, Sarah.

Kanzi 

Kanzi, a bonobo, is believed to understand more human language than any other non-human animal in the world. Kanzi apparently learned by eavesdropping on the keyboard lessons researcher Sue Savage-Rumbaugh was giving to his adoptive mother. Kanzi learned to communicate with a lexigram board, pushing symbols that stand for words. The board is wired to a computer, so the word is then vocalized out loud by the computer. This helps Kanzi develop his vocabulary and enables him to communicate with researchers.

One day, Rumbaugh used the computer to say to Kanzi, "Can you make the dog bite the snake?" It is believed Kanzi had never heard this sentence before. In answering the question, Kanzi searched among the objects present until he found a toy dog and a toy snake, put the snake in the dog's mouth, and used his thumb and finger to close the dog's mouth over the snake. In 2001, Alexander Fiske-Harrison, writing in the Financial Times, observed that Kanzi was "asked by an invisible interrogator through head-phones (to avoid cueing) to identify 35 different items in 180 trials. His success rate was 93 percent." In further testing, beginning when he was  years old, Kanzi was asked 416 complex questions, responding correctly over 74% of the time. Kanzi has been observed verbalizing a meaningful noun to his sister.

Kanzi relies highly on the lexigrams for communication, and frequently uses them to specify where he wants to go, or an item he wants to have. He does this by expressing his goal (location or object) first, and his action (go, chase, carry, give, etc.) last. This notified researchers that Kanzi's way of communicating was different from that of spoken English, especially because Kanzi would communicate many of his action words using simple gestures. In addition, Kanzi is frequently seen linking two action words together using the lexigrams, like "I Tickle", "Chase Hide", or "Chase Bite". These word combinations are not necessarily structured in a way that humans would use spoken English, but they closely resemble lists, consisting of preferred actions, in preferred order of Kanzi's social play. Because of this inconsistency of Kanzi's use of language with the spoken English language, many question whether Kanzi's understanding of English "crosses the boundary with true language".

Attempts to mimic human speech and communication 

Great apes mimicking human speech is rare although some have attempted to do so, and Viki, a chimpanzee, is one of them. During the 1940s and 1950s, Keith and Catherine Hayes of the Yerkes Laboratories of Primate Biology began working with a chimpanzee named Viki in an attempt to get her to mimic human speech. After undergoing months of speech therapy, Viki became their success story. Viki learned to say the words: "mama", "papa", "cup" and "up". Over the years she learned to say up to seven words. Viki was extremely intelligent and like many other non-human primates, would lead people to where she wanted to go as well as move the hands of people onto objects she wanted them to manipulate. However, she would rarely point to objects that she wanted; instead she would use signs to indicate what she wanted to do. For example, when she wanted to help with ironing she would move her hand back and forth above the ironing board. This experiment with Viki would inspire other researchers to conduct similar experiments.

Question asking
Despite their impressive (although still sometimes disputed) achievements, Kanzi and other apes who participated in similar experiments, failed to ask questions themselves. Joseph Jordania suggested that the ability to ask questions is probably the central cognitive element that distinguishes human and animal cognitive abilities. (However, a parrot named Alex was apparently able to ask simple questions. He asked what color he was, and learned "grey" after being told the answer six times.) Enculturated apes, who underwent extensive language training programs, successfully learned to answer quite complex questions and requests (including question words "who", "what", "when", "where", and "why"), although so far they failed to learn how to ask questions themselves. For example, David and Anne Premack wrote: "Though she [Sarah] understood the question, she did not herself ask any questions – unlike the child who asks interminable questions, such as What that? Who making noise? When Daddy come home? Me go Granny's house? Where puppy? Sarah never delayed the departure of her trainer after her lessons by asking where the trainer was going, when she was returning, or anything else". The ability to ask questions is sometimes assessed in relation to comprehension of syntactic structures. Jordania suggested that this approach is not justified, as (1) questioning is primarily a cognitive ability, and (2) questions can be asked without the use of syntactic structures (with the use of specific intonation only). It is widely accepted that the first questions are asked by humans during their early infancy, at the pre-syntactic, one word stage of language development, with the use of question intonation.

Criticisms of primate language research 
Some scientists, including MIT linguist Noam Chomsky and cognitive scientist Steven Pinker, are skeptical about claims made for great ape language research. Among the reasons for skepticism are the differences in ease with which human beings and apes can learn language; there are also questions of whether there is a clear beginning and end to the signed gestures and whether the apes actually understand language or are simply doing a clever trick for a reward.

While vocabulary words from American Sign Language are used to train the apes, native users of ASL may note that mere knowledge of ASL's vocabulary does not equate to knowledge of ASL.

See also 

 Alex (parrot)
 Animal cognition
 Animal communication
 Animal language
 Animal training
 Biosemiotics
 Human-animal communication
 Language – as it pertains to humans
 Language acquisition
 Operant conditioning
 Origin of language
 Primate cognition
 Proto-language (glottogony)
 Theory of mind
 Yerkish

Researchers 

 Roger Fouts
 Francine Patterson
 David Premack
 Sue Savage-Rumbaugh

Research subjects 

 Ai (chimpanzee)
 Chantek (orangutan)
 Kanzi (bonobo)
 Lana (chimpanzee)
 Koko (gorilla)
 Lucy (chimpanzee)
 Nim Chimpsky (chimpanzee)
 Panbanisha (bonobo)
 Sarah (chimpanzee)
 Washoe (chimpanzee)
 Viki (chimpanzee)

Notes

References

External links 
 GaTech.edu  – "Animal Communication" (from the book Language Files, Sixth Edition), editors: Stefanie Jannedy, Robert Poletto, Tracey L. Weldon, Department of Linguistics Ohio State University (1994)
 Great Ape Trust - "Use of Human Languages by Captive Great Apes" from the book World Atlas of Great Apes and Their Conservation'' by Duane Rumbaugh, Sue Savage-Rumbaugh and William Fields (2005)
 Thailand tree apes use song as warning
 Orangutans mime to get message across

Animal intelligence
 
Ethology
Human–animal communication